Gephyromantis rivicola, commonly known as the lesser stream Madagascar frog, is a species of frog in the family Mantellidae.  It is endemic to Madagascar.  Its natural habitat is subtropical or tropical moist lowland forests.  It is threatened by habitat loss.

References

rivicola
Endemic fauna of Madagascar
Taxonomy articles created by Polbot
Amphibians described in 1997